Thursday Next is the protagonist in a series of comic fantasy, alternate history mystery novels by the British author Jasper Fforde.  She was first introduced in Fforde's first published novel, The Eyre Affair, released on 19 July 2001 by Hodder & Stoughton.  , the series comprises seven books, in two series.  The first series is made up of the novels The Eyre Affair, Lost in a Good Book, The Well of Lost Plots and Something Rotten. The second series is so far made up of First Among Sequels, One of Our Thursdays Is Missing and The Woman Who Died a Lot.

Background
Thursday is the daughter of Wednesday Next and Colonel Next, a former agent with Special Operations Network department 12 (SO-12), known as the Chronoguard. She has two brothers, Anton and Joffy. Anton, however, was killed in the Crimean War.

In the novel's parallel universe, England is a republic, with George Formby as its first president, elected following the success of Operation Sea Lion (the mooted Nazi invasion of Great Britain), occupation, and liberation. There is no United Kingdom, and Wales is the independent "Socialist Republic of Wales". The Crimean War is still being waged in 1985, Russia still has a Czar, and the Whig Party still exists in the House of Commons.

In this universe, genetic engineering is advanced, allowing Thursday to have a pet dodo, Pickwick. Re-engineered mammoths can cause damage to local gardens if in their path, and there is a Neanderthal rights movement, given the resurrection of this kindred branch of human evolution. The duck is extinct in this universe. Computer and aviation technology are far behind our own timeline, with the transistor having never been invented (computers are still massive and run on vacuum tubes) and research into the jet engine unfunded as propeller and dirigible technology are viewed as 'good enough'.

The Goliath Corporation is a megalithic company that appears to make many of the goods in this alternate world and also acts as a de facto shadow government, being able to take over important police investigations.

In the world of Thursday Next, literature is a much more popular medium than in our world, and Thursday is a member of SO-27, the Literary Detectives or LiteraTecs. Her work is centred on Swindon, where she, her husband, infant, and mother live.  The importance that literature has in this alternate England is reflected in the fact that so many people want to change their name to that of famous authors that some must be numbered, by law- e.g. John Milton 432. 'WillSpeak' machines are often to be found in public places, such as railway stations - these contain a mannequin of a Shakespearian character and will quote that character's most famous speeches upon payment.

In addition, the line between literature and reality becomes increasingly thin, allowing characters in the books and those in 'real life' to jump in and out of novels. This leads Thursday to change the ending of Jane Eyre, the joke being that the plot we know in our reality is the far superior change caused by Thursday.  This also happens to other classic novels: Uriah Heep becomes the obsequious, and generally insincere character we know, due to an accident inside the book world, and Thursday's uncle Mycroft becomes Sherlock Holmes's brother.

Thursday also finds that the characters in novels are self-aware, knowing they are in a book. They make comments stating they are not needed until page 'such and such,' rather like actors in a play, and thus have time to help Thursday.

The world of fiction has its own police force - Jurisfiction - to ensure that plots in books continue to run smoothly with each reading. Thursday ends up hiding in a book, and working for Jurisfiction. The book Caversham Heights is a detective novel featuring Detective Inspector Jack Spratt and his sergeant, Mary Mary, (listed as Mary Jones in WOLP) who swaps with Thursday. Spratt and Mary get their own Fforde series, The Nursery Crime Division books, and appear in The Big Over Easy and The Fourth Bear featuring crimes against characters in classic children's literature.

Biography

Thursday is in her mid-thirties at the start of the first book, and, by the end of it, had married Landen Parke-Laine.  Thursday juggles her work in Swindon and the world of fiction, battling the machinations of the insidious Goliath Corporation, members of the Hades family and other evils at every turn.

Her biographer and stalker, "Millon de Floss", reveals more about her life at the beginnings of chapters in The Eyre Affair, Lost in a Good Book, The Well of Lost Plots and Something Rotten.

Her father, Colonel Next, is a rogue member of the ChronoGuard (SpecOps 12), a temporal policing agency, and officially does not exist, having been eradicated by his former bosses (using the simple but effective method of a timely knock on the door just before his conception; despite this, his children and grandchild still exist, likely due to Thursday's son Friday Next being the eventual head of the ChronoGuard, and/or the extensive powers of Colonel Next himself). The elder Next does, however, remain at large throughout the time-space continuum, and still frequently finds time to visit Thursday, usually by stopping time around her so they can talk without his being arrested by the ChronoGuard. Colonel Next's first name is unknown to everybody but him, a consequence of his eradication. Thursday has two brothers, Anton, who died in the Crimean War, and Joffy, who is a minister for the Global Standard Deity (GSD).

Thursday also has a pet dodo called Pickwick. Although dodos had been extinct for some time, in Fforde's fictional universe they have been reintroduced through cloning, a popular hobby. Pickwick was 12 years old in 1985, when The Eyre Affair is set, and has some unusual characteristics, including missing wings.  She is a version 1.2 dodo, and the DNA sequencing wasn't complete until the release of 1.7. Although initially Thursday Next believed Pickwick to be male, she later turned out to be female when she laid an egg. Her noise is represented as "plock plock" in the books.

Around Thursday Next a fictional world has been created, reflected in several websites of the fictional organisations.

Bookworld
The BookWorld is a fictitious and complex environment that acts as a "behind-the-scenes" area of books. The BookWorld is most likely "created" by what is known as the Great Panjandrum, a person/thing that is thought to be of the highest of authority, yet is never present, acting as a god of sorts to the BookWorld. As the word panjandrum means someone in high authority, this reaffirms this possibility.

Consisting of 52 levels total, the Great Library acts as a lobby of sorts for the BookWorld and serves as a public gateway onto any book ever created. 26 of the upper levels, organized according to the author's last name, are laid out in a cross shape, with 4 rows of bookcases radiating from a central point.  In order to determine whether bookjumping into a book of choice is deemed appropriate or not, the book cover is either green, for "open", or red for "unavailable". At the top of the Great Library is a large dome that appears to see a large forest like area below, with other Great Libraries in the distance; there being one for every language. The 26 basements, known as the Well of Lost Plots, hold unpublished works, although whether they are arranged alphabetically by level or not has yet to be discovered. Books which are not published are scrapped, and their text recycled for future works.  The Cheshire Cat is the librarian of the Great Library, although due to redistricting in England since the book in which he appears was written, the Cheshire Cat is now known as the Cat Formerly Known as Cheshire, or Unitary Authority of Warrington Cat.

The "engine room" of BookWorld, Text Grand Central uses so-called "storycode engines" to observe changes in books and allow the reader to read books using a complex "imaginotransference system" to supposedly continue the images being created in the reader's mind.

Within the depths of the Well of Lost Plots, the Text Sea is the source of all text for all books, and is the general burial ground for all destroyed characters to be once more reduced to text. Composed of a random jumble of words and punctuation, words are "trawled" for using scrawltrawlers, the equivalent of large fishing boats that capture words.

Communication
Mass communication in the BookWorld is provided by footnoterphones and mobilefootnoterphones.  Messages from others appear as footnotes in the text, the "number" of a footnoterphone being the chosen character's book, chapter, page number, paragraph, and line in a book. Connection between phones is created by hidden tunnel conduits that are invisible in the book, such tunnels spanning distances between other books and other genres.  Connections can be crossed and filtered out using "textual sieves", which filter out all incoming text. Junkfootnoterphones are the "spam" messages of BookWorld, frequently appearing in the Well of Lost Plots.  News is also put over footnoterphones, which can be turned on and off at will.

Newspapers are the second choice at receiving news in BookWorld.  The primary newspaper in the BookWorld is called The Word.  Specific newsletters, such as Moveable Type, the official newsletter of Jurisfiction, may apply to certain groups of characters.

Transportation
While bookjumping appears to be a given talent to all fictional characters, the bookjumping ability is a rarity in those from outside BookWorld.  Bookjumping involves "reading" yourself into a book, appearing in the storyline at the point read.  Such natural talent or ability may be approved in some manner by teaching "quality" bookjumping, and bookjumping may be possible without reading the text aloud.   In order to avoid potentially destroying a book's plot, however, one must be careful to avoid jumping directly into an area where the plot is occurring, although most bookjumps send the jumper to a place directly outside of the narrative area.  A bookjump is characterized by a "fade out" of the character bookjumping.

If a character cannot or does not wish to bookjump, they will have to utilize a method of private transportation.  The only such transportation known is that of TransGenre Taxis, a bookjumping taxi service that may be used for a monetary fee.

Most unorganized crime takes place in the Well of Lost Plots, due to its lack of crime control in that area.  Such common crime includes illegal selling of plot devices, characters, and others.

Due to the frequent instability of much of the BookWorld, a public police agency, instated by the Council of Genres (See Government), uses bookjumping and other devices to keep the BookWorld under control.  The central and only crime-preventing force, Jurisfiction has jurisdiction over nearly all areas of the BookWorld. Once having volunteered for Jurisfiction, the applicant then becomes an apprentice to a chosen Jurisfiction agent.  All agents are given an essential TravelBook, a necessary item for all situations. Containing needed Jursifiction devices and a link back to the Great Library as well as other popular works of fiction, the TravelBook also acts as a guide to the BookWorld and is password protected to each individual member. Agents deemed appropriate are also given the password to an unpublished work that acts as a bestiary and a research faculty for BookWorld creatures. (See Creatures.)  Upon passing a written exam and practical exam, an apprentice is given full agent status.

Government
While Jurisfiction is given a large amount of power in the BookWorld, the primary legislative government is the Council of Genres, made up of a representative from every genre in the BookWorld.  Ruling upon various issues and creating ordinances to counteract them, there is no official executive of the Council of Genres. Concerning judiciary matters, the Council has no control.  Courtroom scenes across the BookWorld are used for this purpose, the judge and jury of each scene presiding over the case at hand.

Creatures
Adjective-creating creatures and maggot-like in appearance, bookworms act as portable thesauri, changing common adjectives into others (for example "nice" into "amiable" or "attractive"). Their presence is welcome in most areas, however, should too many infest one area, the area uses too many adjectives and "flowery language", making the text unreadable.

A variety of species occurring, the grammasite was a failed attempt to change nouns into verbs. Escaping from the experiment, their release resulted in a disaster, as they can contribute severe damage to a book.  The known types of grammasites include adjectivores, which suck all description from an object, and verbisoids, as well as others. Verbisoids can be beaten by irregular verbs.

Languages
Although the actual language of the BookWorld is English, there are also other Great Libraries that are apparently completely other languages. The actual sublanguages of each BookWorld, however, are regarded as fonts.

Thus (according to Bradshaw's BookWorld Companion) 'Courier Bold is the traditional language of those in the support industries such as within the Well of Lost Plots, and Lorem Ipsum is the gutter slang of the underworld - useful to have a few phrases in case you get into trouble in Horror or Noir'.

(Lorem ipsum is a dummy text used to demonstrate layout. It is the only language Friday Next speaks as a young child).

Real World Allusions
On his website Fforde reports that the Swindon Town Planning office, due to expansion and the need to name new streets, asked him if he would mind them using names of characters from his books. While Fforde seems to have written the page with his tongue in his cheek several new streets in the Orchid Vale area of Swindon have the names of literary characters that appear in the Thursday Next series. These include Thursday Street, Friday Street, Mycroft Road, Havisham Drive, Estella Close, Eyre Close, Braxton Road and Bradshaw Court.
https://goo.gl/maps/ZZVWf6HysLgbsAYA7

References

External links
 Website of the fictional organisation SpecOps
 Website of the fictional organisation Goliath Corporation
 Website of the fictional city Swindon in the parallel universe

Female characters in literature
Literary characters introduced in 2001
Book series introduced in 2001

Fictional detectives
Characters in fantasy literature
Alternate history novels
Fiction about neanderthals
Wiltshire in fiction
Jasper Fforde